The 2016–17 Ligue 1 Mauritania season was the 36th season of the premier football league in Mauritania. It began on 19 September 2015 and concluded on 17 May 2016.

Standings

References

Mauritanian Premier League seasons
Premier League
Premier League
Mauritania